Greek National Road 36 is a national highway on the island of Lesbos, Greece. It connects Mytilene with Kalloni.

36
Roads in the North Aegean
Lesbos